Michael Tregor (born 10 September 1950 in Santiago de Chile, Chile) is a German television actor. He resides in Munich.

Selected filmography
 1978 - 
 1979 -  (TV series)
 1986 - Fotofinish
 1988 - 
 1992 - König Lear
 1997 - Verdammtes Glück
 2000 - Der tote Taucher im Wald
 2004 - Der weiße Afrikaner
 2005 - Unter Verdacht - Das Karussell

External links

Doris Mattes Agency Munich 

1950 births
Living people
German male television actors
People from Santiago
Male actors from Munich